Nepal Mahata (born 26 October 1961) is an Indian politician belonging to Indian National Congress who is currently serving his fourth term as a MLA in West Bengal state legislative assembly representing Baghmundi constituency (earlier name Jhalda constituency) since 2001. He is also currently serving as the Working president in the West Bengal state congress Committee. By profession he is a teacher and is currently serving as a secretary in Ichag High School.

Personal life and education
Nepal Mahato was born in Purulia district of West Bengal to Debendra Nath Mahata and Bhabarani Mahata. He is married to Rita Mahata and has a son Debmohan Mahata,is currently pursuing M.B.B.S at ICARE Institute Of Medical Sciences And Research And Dr.Bidhan Chandra Roy Hospital, Haldia (2022-2023 Batch). 

Mahato did his schooling from Jhalda Satyabhama Vidyapith. He then joined JK college and University of Burdwan, where he completed his bachelor's and master's degree in Applied mathematics, before taking admission in Chotonagpur Law College (under University of Ranchi) to pursue LLB. He further went on to obtain a BEd in Mathematics from Ignou, making his dream of becoming a teacher come true.

Electoral performances
Mahato first got elected from Jhalda constituency in 2001 and then again in 2006, 2011 and 2016, (last two after the renaming of his constituency post delimitation in 2009). He was also the candidate of his party for Purulia Lok sabha seat in 2014 and 2019.

References

External links
Twitter account - https://twitter.com/NepalMahata_INC?s=20
WB Legislative assembly website - http://www.wbassembly.gov.in/MLA_WhosWho.aspx

 

Living people
Indian schoolteachers
1961 births
West Bengal MLAs 2001–2006
West Bengal MLAs 2006–2011
West Bengal MLAs 2011–2016
West Bengal MLAs 2016–2021